Luis Guillermo Vasquez (born April 23, 1986) is an American football defensive lineman who is currently a free agent. He played college football at Arizona State University.

College career
Vasquez signed to play with the Purdue Boilermakers football team in 2004, where he redshirted during the 2004 season. Vasquez transferred to Arizona Western College, where he was named the Western States Football League Defensive Player of the Year in 2005. Vasquez had originally committed to Washington State, but when Robb Akey left to take the head coaching job at Idaho, Vasquez decommited and chose Arizona State.

Professional career

Baltimore Ravens
After going undrafted in the 2009 NFL Draft, Vasquez signed as an undrafted free agent with the Baltimore Ravens. In June 2009, Vasquez was released.

Arkansas Diamonds
In 2010, Vasquez played for the Arkansas Diamonds of the Indoor Football League (IFL), where he was named a 2nd Team All-IFL performer after the season.

Dallas Vigilantes
On December 15, 2010, Vasquez was assigned to the Dallas Vigilantes of the Arena Football League (AFL).

Milwaukee Iron/Mustangs
On April 21, 2011, Vasquez was traded to the Milwaukee Iron for future considerations. Upon the completion of the 2012 season, Vasquez was named 2nd Team All-Arena

San Jose SaberCats
In 2012, Vasquez joined the San Jose SaberCats.

Arizona Rattlers
On February 17, 2016, Vasquez was assigned to the Arizona Rattlers.

Guangzhou Power
Vasquez was selected by the Guangzhou Power of the China Arena Football League (CAFL) in the 21st round of the 2016 CAFL Draft.

References

External links
Arizona State bio
Arena Football bio

Living people
1986 births
American football linebackers
American football defensive ends
Arizona Western Matadors football players
Arizona State Sun Devils football players
Arkansas Diamonds players
Dallas Vigilantes players
Milwaukee Mustangs (2009–2012) players
Players of American football from Connecticut
San Jose SaberCats players
Arizona Rattlers players
People from Gales Ferry, Connecticut
Guangzhou Power players